Carlo Semenza may refer to:
 Carlo Semenza (engineer) (1893–1961), Italian hydraulic engineer 
 Carlo Semenza (neuroscientist) (born 1949), Italian neuroscientist